The Rajendra Stadium is a multi-purpose stadium located in Katihar, Bihar. The stadium has capacity of 15,000 spectators. The stadium is a venue for football tournaments, fairs & exhibition. It is used mostly for association football matches  and the stadium is named after the first President of India Dr. Rajendra Prasad. Tenants RK Steel FC sometimes drew crowds above 10,000 for their association football matches at the Rajendra Stadium.

See also
Bihar Football Association

References

External links 
 Wikimapia

Siwan district
Sports venues in Bihar
Cricket grounds in Bihar
Football venues in Bihar
Memorials to Rajendra Prasad
Year of establishment missing